Max Friedländer may refer to:

Max Friedländer (journalist) (1829–1872), Silesia-born Austrian journalist
Max Friedlaender (musicologist) (1852–1934), Silesia-born German bass singer and musicologist
Max Jakob Friedländer (1867–1958), Berlin-born German art historian
Max Friedlaender (lawyer) (1873–1956), German lawyer

See also 
 Friedländer